Si Xinliang (born January 1950) is a former Chinese politician. From 2010 to 2013, Si served as the Vice Chairman of the Zhejiang Provincial People's Political Consultative Conference, a mostly ceremonial legislative consultation body. Prior to that, Si served as the chief of the Organization Department of the Zhejiang provincial Communist party Committee. He worked for several years under Xi Jinping, who was serving as the party chief of Zhejiang.

Biography
Si was born and raised in Dongyang, Zhejiang province in January 1950. Si joined the Communist Party in 1981. He has a degree from Zhejiang Agricultural University (later merged into Zhejiang University) in animal husbandry.

Si spent his entire career in Zhejiang province. He worked at a food processing company in his home county as a manager before entering politics, first as deputy county governor. He rose through the ranks and successively served as the Communist Party Secretary of Pujiang County, the head of the Organization Department for the party organization in the city of Huzhou and later deputy party chief. He was then promoted to party chief, then the provincial propaganda department head.

Si served as chief of the provincial party Organization Department for nearly a decade, between 2001 and 2010, serving under three party secretaries, Zhang Dejiang, Xi Jinping, and Zhao Hongzhu. 

In 2010, Si, having reached the mandatory retirement age of 60, was transferred from his Organization Department leadership position to take on the largely ceremonial role of Vice Chairman of the Zhejiang Provincial People's Political Consultative Conference. Si was detained for investigation in February 2015 by the Central Commission for Discipline Inspection. Si was notable for being the first provincial-ministerial level official to be detained from Zhejiang province since the 18th Party Congress, and also being the first official of his rank who once worked directly under Xi Jinping to be investigated.

Si Xinliang's son, Si Li, a provincial Communist Youth League official, was also detained.

On June 19, 2015, after investigation by the CCDI, Si was expelled from the Communist Party. He was accused of violating the Eight-point Regulation, "playing golf rounds paid for by others", aiding the promotion and business activities of associates and taking "massive bribes", and "committed adultery." He was also said to have conspired with his wife to hide "ill-gotten gains" after gaining knowledge of his investigation, and "interfered and obstructed" the investigation. Si was sentenced 13 years in prison for accepting bribes amounting to nearly 20 million yuan (around $2.9 million) by a court in Jiangxi province on December 13, 2016.

References

1950 births
Living people
Chinese Communist Party politicians from Zhejiang
People's Republic of China politicians from Zhejiang
People from Dongyang
Expelled members of the Chinese Communist Party
Chinese politicians convicted of corruption